The Virgin Mary, also known as Mater Dolorosa, although this title is now considered misleading, is a late 1590s or early 1600s painting by the Greek born, Spanish Mannerist painter Doménikos Theotokópoulos (El Greco). It is on display in the Musée des Beaux-Arts of Strasbourg, France. Its inventory number is 276. A similar looking canvas in the Museo del Prado is considered a weaker replica.

The Strasbourg painting was presented to the museum in 1892 by John Charles Robinson, who had strong commercial ties to its director, Wilhelm von Bode. [The accession date was given as 1893 in previous publications.]

Mary is depicted with the face of an adolescent girl. The portrait painting type corresponds to a variation of the Byzantine Theotokos, with which Doménikos Theotokópoulos was naturally familiar.

References

External links 

Mater Dolorosa , presentation on the museum's website

Paintings in the collection of the Musée des Beaux-Arts de Strasbourg
Paintings by El Greco
1590s paintings
Oil on canvas paintings
Our Lady of Sorrows
Paintings of the Virgin Mary